Billy Mahan (July 9, 1930 – August 30, 2002) was an American film actor. A child actor, he played the recurring role of Bobby Jones in Twentieth Century Fox's Jones Family series of films. His son is voice actor Kerrigan Mahan.

Selected filmography
 Every Saturday Night (1936)
 Educating Father (1936)
 Back to Nature (1936)
 The Jones Family in Big Business (1937)
 Hot Water (1937)
 Borrowing Trouble (1937)
 A Trip to Paris (1938)
 Quick Millions (1939)
 Young as You Feel (1940)

References

Bibliography
 Drew, Bernard A. Motion Picture Series and Sequels: A Reference Guide. Routledge, 2013.
 Holmstrom, John. The Moving Picture Boy: An International Encyclopaedia from 1895 to 1995, Norwich, Michael Russell, 1996, p. 169.

External links

1930 births
2002 deaths
American male film actors
20th-century American male actors